Ockie Barnard (born 21 April 2001) is a South African rugby union player for the  in the Currie Cup. His regular position is lock.

Barnard was named in the  side for the 2022 Currie Cup Premier Division.

References

South African rugby union players
Living people
Rugby union locks
Free State Cheetahs players
2001 births
People from Richards Bay
Sharks (rugby union) players
Sharks (Currie Cup) players